Horatio Gates Onderdonk House is a historic home located in the Strathmore neighborhood of Manhasset, in Nassau County, New York. It was built in 1836 and is a Greek Revival style building with a two-story, three bay central mass flanked by one story, one bay wings. It features a giant portico supported by four Doric order columns. By 1933, the Onderdonk farm was purchased for development by Levitt and Sons, who built the neighboring North Strathmore community. The house served as an office facility for the development, until the formation of the Strathmore Association, a membership organization composed of the owners of Strathmore property. The house and four corner plots adjoining "The Circle" were conveyed to the association on December 3, 1936, and the property has been maintained by the Strathmore Association since that time.

It was listed on the National Register of Historic Places in 1980.

References

External links

Manhasset, New York
Houses on the National Register of Historic Places in New York (state)
National Register of Historic Places in Nassau County, New York
National Register of Historic Places in North Hempstead (town), New York
Historic American Buildings Survey in New York (state)
Greek Revival houses in New York (state)
Houses in Nassau County, New York
Houses completed in 1836